Wang Cong (born 15 May 1992) is a Chinese boxer and Sanda kickboxer. She was the Kunlun Fight Women's Lightweight Champion as well as the Kunlun Fight 2018 Legend of Mulan Tournament winner.

Her most notable victory came in 2015 where she defeated UFC Women's Flyweight Champion, Valentina Shevchenko in a kickboxing match at Kunlun Fight 33.

With regards to her amateur credentials, she won a gold medal in Sanda at the 2013 World Wushu Championships and another gold medal at the 2014 Asian Games.

She won a silver medal in amateur boxing at the 2019 World Championships.

Championships and accomplishments
 Kunlun Fight 2018 Women's Tournament Champion
 Kunlun Fight Women's Lightweight Championship

Kickboxing record 

|-  style="text-align:center; background:#cfc;"
| 2018-09-29 || Win||align=left| Sarel de Jong || David Zunwu World Fighting Championship || Macau || Decision  || 3 || 3:00
|-
|-  style="background:#cfc;"
| 2018-09-09 || Win ||align=left| Zhu Mengjia || Kunlun Fight 76 - 2018 Legend of Mulan Tournament, Final || Shangqiu, China || Decision || 3 || 3:00
|-
! style=background:white colspan=9 |Wins the Kunlun Fight 2018 Legend of Mulan Tournament.
|-
|-  style="background:#cfc;"
| 2018-09-09 || Win ||align=left| Nili Block || Kunlun Fight 76 - 2018 Legend of Mulan Tournament, Semi Finals || Shangqiu, China || Decision || 3 || 3:00
|-  style="background:#cfc;"
| 2018-09-09 || Win ||align=left| Niamh Kinehan || Kunlun Fight 76 - 2018 Legend of Mulan Tournament, Quarter Finals || Shangqiu, China || Decision || 3 || 3:00
|-  style="background:#cfc;"
| 2018-04-07 || Win ||align=left| Marion Montanari || Wu Lin Feng 2018: Shijiazhuang || Shijiazhuang, China || Decision  || 3 || 3:00

|-  style="background:#cfc;"
| 2017-10-28 || Win ||align=left| Natalia Leskiv || WKA World Super Sanda King|| Beijing, China || KO (Staight to the body)|| 3 || 1:48
|-  style="background:#cfc;"
| 2016-01-09 || Win ||align=left| Svetlana Vinnikova || Kunlun Fight 36 || Shanghai, China || Decision || 3 || 3:00

|-  style="background:#cfc;"
| 2015-10-31 || Win ||align=left| Valentina Shevchenko || Kunlun Fight 33 || Changde, China || Decision || 3 || 3:00
|-
! style=background:white colspan=9 |Wins the Kunlun Fight Women's Lightweight Championship.
|- style="background:#c5d2ea;"
| 2010-11-13 || Draw ||align=left| Tiffany van Soest || Wu Lin Feng: Las Vegas Spectacular || Las Vegas, Nevada, USA || Draw (majority) || 3 || 3:00
|-

Mixed martial arts record

|-
|Win
|align=center| 1–0
|Ji Hongfeng
|Submission (rear naked choke)
|Wu Lin Feng x Huya Kung Fu Carnival 6
|
|align=center| 2
|align=center| 
|Zhengzhou, China
|

References

1992 births
Living people
AIBA Women's World Boxing Championships medalists
Chinese women boxers
Lightweight boxers
Lightweight kickboxers
Chinese female kickboxers
Wushu practitioners at the 2014 Asian Games
Medalists at the 2014 Asian Games
Asian Games gold medalists for China
Asian Games medalists in wushu
Chinese sanshou practitioners
Sportspeople from Liaoning
Kunlun Fight kickboxing champions
Kunlun Fight kickboxers
Chinese female mixed martial artists
Mixed martial artists utilizing sanshou
Mixed martial artists utilizing kickboxing
Mixed martial artists utilizing boxing